The Lord Reims Stakes is a South Australian Jockey Club Group 3 Thoroughbred horse race for horses aged three years old and older, over a distance of 2600 metres at Morphettville Racecourse in Adelaide, Australia in March. Total prizemoney is A$127,250.

History
The race was renamed in 2010 to Lord Reims Stakes after Lord Reims, who won this race in 1988 and 1989 and also winning the Adelaide Cup three consecutive times between 1987–1989. The event is a traditional lead-up race to the Adelaide Cup.

Distance
 1889–1971 - 1 miles (~2400 metres)
 1973–1979 – 2400 metres
 1980–1981 – 2600 metres
 1982–1985 – 2450 metres
 1986–1997 – 2400 metres
 1998–2003 – 2500 metres
 2004 onwards - 2600 metres

Grade
 1889–1979 -  Principal Race
 1980 onwards - Group 3

Name
 1889–1979  -    West End Draught Stakes
 1980–1984  -    West End Stakes
 1985–1991  -    West End Export Stakes
 1992 - West End Super Stakes
 1993–1994  -    Eagle Blue Stakes
 1995–2000  -    West End Draught Stakes
 2001–2008  -    Carlton Draught Stakes
 2009 - Tooheys New Stakes
 2010 onwards - Lord Reims Stakes

Doubles win
The following thoroughbreds have won the Cups Double: Lord Reims Stakes (West End Draught Stakes) – Adelaide Cup in the same year.
  Vakeel (1893), Port Admiral (1894), Warpaint (1896), Stralia (1925), Altimeter (1928), Parallana (1929), Far Away Places (1961), Fulmen (1967), Phar Ace (1974), Yashmak (1980), Moss Kingdom (1984), Lord Reims (1988, 1989), Water Boatman (1990), Ideal Centreman (1991),  French Resort (1996), Cronus (1997) and Apache King (2001)

Winners

 2023 - Highland Jakk
 2022 - Canford
 2021 - Tralee Rose
 2020 - Eperdument
 2019 - Bondeiger
 2018 - Etah James
 2017 - Master Of Arts
 2016 - Signoff
2015 - Taiyoo 
 2014 - Distillation
 2013 - My Ex Mate
 2012 - Enchanting Wate
 2011 - Guyno
 2010 - Moment In Time
 2009 - Miss Pavlova
 2008 - Exalted Ego
 2007 - Danebar
 2006 - Royal Player
 2005 - Far Lane
 2004 - Bel Air
 2003 - Le Destina
 2002 - Firetaine
 2001 - Apache King
 2000 - Frenzel Rhomb
 1999 - Star Binder
 1998 - Heed The Toll
 1997 - Cronus
 1996 - French Resort
 1995 - Balmeressa
 1994 - Top Rating
 1993 - Toy Image
 1992 - Runaway Groom
 1991 - Ideal Centreman
 1990 - Water Boatman
 1989 - Lord Reims
 1988 - Lord Reims
 1987 - Bourbon Boy
 1986 - Foxseal
 1985 - Beguiled
 1984 - Moss Kingdom
 1983 - Our Shout
 1982 - Dealer’s Choice
 1981 - Pearl Lover
 1980 - Yashmak
 1979 - North Fleet
 1978 - Muros
 1977 - Wave King
 1976 - Inceptor
 1975 - Herminia
 1974 - Phar Ace
 1973 - Dark Suit
 1972 - race not held
 1971 - Counterfeit
 1970 - Tavel
 1969 - Wool Beau
 1968 - Fulmen
 1967 - Fulmen
 1966 - Polly Perfect
 1965 - Welltown
 1964 - Baroda Gleam
 1963 - Sometime
 1962 - Lucky Fred
 1961 - Far Away Places
 1960 - Gaybao
 1959 - Trellios
 1958 - Newstone
 1957 - Thaumus
 1956 - Storm Glow
 1955 - Falcon Gold
 1954 - Falcon Gold
 1953 - Rousvaross
 1952 - Double Blank
 1951 - Peter Pim
 1950 - King Comedy
 1949 - Typical
 1948 - † Chatspa / Typical
 1947 - Tuckout
 1946 - Best Idea
 1945 - King Opera
 1944 - race not held
 1943 - race not held
 1942 - race not held
 1941 - Prince Ariel
 1940 - Saint Warden
 1939 - Earl Sion
 1938 - Koklani
 1937 - Mutable
 1936 - Celotex
 1935 - Art
 1934 - Bajardo
 1933 - Glenvarloch
 1932 - Kalford
 1931 - Suzumi
 1930 - Sceutum
 1929 - Parallana
 1928 - Altimeter
 1927 - Cadelgo
 1926 - Spearer
 1925 - Stralia
 1924 - Cadelgo
 1923 - Castlton
 1922 - Sandbee
 1921 - Our Artillery
 1920 - Daarewin
 1919 - Bon Vue
 1918 - Dependence
 1917 - Scot’s Jean
 1916 - King’s Chancellor
 1915 - Admirable Bob
 1914 - Bective
 1913 - Ptah
 1912 - Braw Scot
 1911 - Fastness
 1910 - Becky
 1909 - Fiction
 1908 - Willy Wally
 1907 - Metal Queen
 1906 - Spinaway
 1905 - Masher
 1904 - Barr
 1903 - Florin
 1902 - Lorne
 1901 - Randwick
 1900 - Martagon
 1899 - Goodwill
 1898 - Eleusinian
 1897 - Loyalty
 1896 - Warpaint
 1895 - Auraria
 1894 - Port Admiral
 1893 - Vakeel
 1892 - Lord Chesterfield
 1891 - Emmie
 1890 - Ivanhoe
 1889 - Britannia

† Dead heat

See also
 List of Australian Group races
 Group races

References

Horse races in Australia
Sport in Adelaide